The Twin Temples at Keezhaiyur is a 9th-century temple complex built by the Paluvettaraiyar chieftains who were vassals of the Medieval Cholas at Keezhaiyur on the Trichy-Ariyalur highway.

Architecture 
As the name suggests, the complex consists of two temples. The temple in the north is called Vadavaayil Sirikoil or Chozheecharam and the one in the south is called Thenvaaayil Sirikoil or Agatheeswaram. The temples were constructed by the Paluvettaraiyar chieftains Kumaran Maravan and Kumaran Kandan.

Gallery

See also 
Paluvettaraiyar
Chola

References 

9th-century establishments in India
Hindu temples in Tamil Nadu